The Magnus effect is an observable phenomenon commonly associated with a spinning object moving through a fluid. The path of the spinning object is deflected in a manner not present when the object is not spinning. The deflection can be explained by the difference in pressure of the fluid on opposite sides of the spinning object. The Magnus effect is dependent on the speed of rotation.

The most readily observable case of the Magnus effect is when a spinning sphere (or cylinder) curves away from the arc it would follow if it were not spinning. It is often used by association football and volleyball players, baseball pitchers, and cricket bowlers. Consequently, the phenomenon is important in the study of the physics of many ball sports. It is also an important factor in the study of the effects of spinning on guided missiles—and has some engineering uses, for instance in the design of rotor ships and Flettner aeroplanes.

Topspin in ball games is defined as spin about a horizontal axis perpendicular to the direction of travel that moves the top surface of the ball in the direction of travel. Under the Magnus effect, topspin produces a downward swerve of a moving ball, greater than would be produced by gravity alone. Backspin produces an upwards force that prolongs the flight of a moving ball. Likewise side-spin causes swerve to either side as seen during some baseball pitches, e.g. slider. The overall behaviour is similar to that around an aerofoil (see lift force), but with a circulation generated by mechanical rotation rather than shape of the foil.

The Magnus effect is named after Heinrich Gustav Magnus, the German physicist who investigated it. The force on a rotating cylinder is known as Kutta–Joukowski lift, after Martin Kutta and Nikolay Zhukovsky (or Joukowski), who first analyzed the effect.

Pressure gradient force
The pressure-gradient force  is the force that results when there is a difference in pressure across a surface.  In general, a pressure is a force per unit area, across a surface.  A difference in pressure across a surface then implies a difference in force, which can result in an acceleration according to Newton's second law of motion, if there is no additional force to balance it.  The resulting force is always directed from the region of higher-pressure to the region of lower-pressure.  When a fluid is in an equilibrium state (i.e. there are no net forces, and no acceleration), the system is referred to as being in hydrostatic equilibrium.  In the case of atmospheres, the pressure-gradient force is balanced by the gravitational force, maintaining hydrostatic equilibrium. In Earth's atmosphere, for example, air pressure decreases at altitudes above Earth's surface, thus providing a pressure-gradient force which counteracts the force of gravity on the atmosphere.

The Magnus-Force of a spinning object is the difference in pressure between opposing sides of the object scaled by the cross-sectional Area:

When solved for the rotational speed of a smooth ball the resulting force is given as

Physics 
An intuitive understanding of the phenomenon comes from Newton's third law, that the deflective force on the body is a reaction to the deflection that the body imposes on the air-flow. The body "pushes" the air in one direction, and the air pushes the body in the other direction. In particular, a lifting force is accompanied by a downward deflection of the air-flow. It is an angular deflection in the fluid flow, aft of the body.

Lyman Briggs made a wind tunnel study of the Magnus effect on baseballs, and others have produced images of the effect. The studies show that a turbulent wake behind the spinning ball causes aerodynamic drag, plus there is a noticeable angular deflection in the wake, and this deflection is in the direction of spin.

The process by which a turbulent wake develops aft of a body in an airflow is complex, but well-studied in aerodynamics. The thin boundary layer detaches itself ("flow separation") from the body at some point, and this is where the wake begins to develop. The boundary layer itself may be turbulent or not, and that has a significant effect on the wake formation. Quite small variations in the surface conditions of the body can influence the onset of wake formation and thereby have a marked effect on the downstream flow pattern. The influence of the body's rotation is of this kind.

It is said that Magnus himself wrongly postulated a theoretical effect with laminar flow due to skin friction and viscosity as the cause of the Magnus effect. Such effects are physically possible but slight in comparison to what is produced in the Magnus effect proper. In some circumstances the causes of the Magnus effect can produce a deflection opposite to that of the Magnus effect.

The diagram above shows lift being produced on a back-spinning ball. The wake and trailing air-flow have been deflected downwards. The boundary layer motion is more violent at the underside of the ball where the spinning movement of the ball's surface is forward and reinforces the effect of the ball's translational movement. The boundary layer generates wake turbulence after a short interval.

In baseball, this effect is used to generate the downward motion of a curveball, in which the baseball is rotating forward (with 'topspin'). Participants in other sports played with a ball also take advantage of this effect.

On a cylinder, the force due to rotation is known as Kutta–Joukowski lift.  It can be analysed in terms of the vortex produced by rotation.  The lift on the cylinder per unit length, is the product of the velocity, v (in metres per second), the density of the fluid, ρ (in kg/m3), and the strength of the vortex established by the rotation, G:

where the vortex strength is given by

where s is the rotation of the cylinder (in revolutions per second), ω is the angular velocity of spin of the cylinder (in radians / second) and r is the radius of the cylinder (in metres).

History 
The German physicist Heinrich Gustav Magnus described the effect in 1852. However, in 1672, Isaac Newton had described it and correctly inferred the cause after observing tennis players in his Cambridge college. In 1742, Benjamin Robins, a British mathematician, ballistics researcher, and military engineer, explained deviations in the trajectories of musket balls in terms of the Magnus effect.

In sport 

The Magnus effect explains commonly observed deviations from the typical trajectories or paths of spinning balls in sport, notably association football, table tennis, tennis, volleyball, golf, baseball, and cricket.

The curved path of a golf ball known as slice or hook is largely due to the ball's spin axis being tilted away from the horizontal due to the combined effects of club face angle and swing path, causing the Magnus Effect to act at an angle, moving the ball away from a straight line in its trajectory. Backspin (upper surface rotating backwards from the direction of movement) on a golf ball causes a vertical force that counteracts the force of gravity slightly, and enables the ball to remain airborne a little longer than it would were the ball not spinning: this allows the ball to travel farther than a ball not spinning about its horizontal axis.

In table tennis, the Magnus effect is easily observed, because of the small mass and low density of the ball. An experienced player can place a wide variety of spins on the ball. Table tennis rackets usually have a surface made of rubber to give the racket maximum grip on the ball to impart a spin.

The Magnus effect is not responsible for the movement of the cricket ball seen in conventional swing bowling, although it may be responsible for "Malinga Swing" and does contribute to the motion known as drift and dip in spin bowling.

In airsoft, a system known as hop-up is used to create a backspin on a fired BB, which greatly increases its range, using the Magnus effect in a similar manner as in golf.

In baseball, pitchers often impart different spins on the ball, causing it to curve in the desired direction due to the Magnus effect. The PITCHf/x system measures the change in trajectory caused by Magnus in all pitches thrown in Major League Baseball.

The match ball for the 2010 FIFA World Cup has been criticised for the different Magnus effect from previous match balls. The ball was described as having less Magnus effect and as a result flies farther but with less controllable swerve.

In external ballistics 
The Magnus effect can also be found in advanced external ballistics.  First, a spinning bullet in flight is often subject to a crosswind, which can be simplified as blowing from either the left or the right. In addition to this, even in completely calm air a bullet experiences a small sideways wind component due to its yawing motion. This yawing motion along the bullet's flight path means that the nose of the bullet points in a slightly different direction from the direction the bullet travels. In other words, the bullet "skids" sideways at any given moment, and thus experiences a small sideways wind component in addition to any crosswind component.

The combined sideways wind component of these two effects causes a Magnus force to act on the bullet, which is perpendicular both to the direction the bullet is pointing and the combined sideways wind. In a very simple case where we ignore various complicating factors, the Magnus force from the crosswind would cause an upward or downward force to act on the spinning bullet (depending on the left or right wind and rotation), causing deflection of the bullet's flight path up or down, thus influencing the point of impact.

Overall, the effect of the Magnus force on a bullet's flight path itself is usually insignificant compared to other forces such as aerodynamic drag. However, it greatly affects the bullet's stability, which in turn affects the amount of drag, how the bullet behaves upon impact, and many other factors. The stability of the bullet is affected, because the Magnus effect acts on the bullet's centre of pressure instead of its centre of gravity. This means that it affects the yaw angle of the bullet; it tends to twist the bullet along its flight path, either towards the axis of flight (decreasing the yaw thus stabilising the bullet) or away from the axis of flight (increasing the yaw thus destabilising the bullet). The critical factor is the location of the centre of pressure, which depends on the flowfield structure, which in turn depends mainly on the bullet's speed (supersonic or subsonic), but also the shape, air density and surface features. If the centre of pressure is ahead of the centre of gravity, the effect is destabilizing; if the centre of pressure is behind the centre of gravity, the effect is stabilising.

In aviation 

Some aircraft have been built to use the Magnus effect to create lift with a rotating cylinder instead of a wing, allowing flight at lower horizontal speeds. The earliest attempt to use the Magnus effect for a heavier-than-air aircraft was in 1910 by a US member of Congress, Butler Ames of Massachusetts. The next attempt was in the early 1930s by three inventors in New York state.

Ship propulsion and stabilization 

Rotor ships use mast-like cylinders, called Flettner rotors, for propulsion.  These are mounted vertically on the ship's deck. When the wind blows from the side, the Magnus effect creates a forward thrust. Thus, as with any sailing ship, a rotor ship can only move forwards when there is a wind blowing. The effect is also used in a special type of ship stabilizer consisting of a rotating cylinder mounted beneath the waterline and emerging laterally. By controlling the direction and speed of rotation, strong lift or downforce can be generated. The largest deployment of the system to date is in the motor yacht Eclipse.

See also 
 Air resistance
 Ball of the Century
 Bernoulli's principle
 Coandă effect
 Fluid dynamics
 Kite types
 Navier–Stokes equations
 Reynolds number
 Tesla turbine

References

Further reading

External links 

 Magnus Cups, Ri Channel Video, January 2012
 Analytic Functions, The Magnus Effect, and Wings at MathPages
 How do bullets fly? Ruprecht Nennstiel, Wiesbaden, Germany
 How do bullets fly? old version (1998), by Ruprecht Nennstiel
 Anthony Thyssen's Rotor Kites page
 Has plans on how to build a model
 Harnessing wind power using the Magnus effect
 Researchers Observe Magnus Effect in Light for First Time
 Quantum Maglift 
 Video:Applications of the Magnus effect

Fluid dynamics